"Rinkaku" (輪郭, "Silhouette") is the 28th single by Japanese heavy metal band Dir En Grey, released on December 19, 2012. Its highest ranking reached fourth place on the weekly Oricon chart. 
The original cover art is created by vocalist Kyo, which was shown at various venues in Japan after release of the single. Rinkaku was released in three editions (regular, limited, and an order-only deluxe edition).

Tracks

Limited Edition DVD

Deluxe Edition DVD

”Kiri to Mayu” (霧と繭) is a re-recorded version from their debut EP Missa.
All live performances featured on the deluxe DVD are from the Tour 2011 Age Quod Agis concert "Ratio ducat, non fortuna" at Tokyo Dome City Hall on 2011.11.11.

References

2012 singles
Dir En Grey songs
Songs written by Kyo (musician)
2012 songs